is a Japanese former professional footballer who played as a midfielder. He is widely considered to be one of the greatest Asian players of all time.

Nakata began his professional career in 1995 and won the Asian Football Confederation Player of the Year award in 1997 and 1998, the Scudetto with Roma in 2001, played for Japan in three World Cup tournaments (1998, 2002 and 2006) and competed in the Olympics twice (1996 and 2000). In 2005, he was made the Knight of the Order of the Star of Italian Solidarity, one of Italy's highest honors, for improving the country's image overseas. Nakata has also been involved in fashion, regularly attending runway shows and wearing designer clothing.

Nakata announced his retirement at age 29 on 3 July 2006, after a ten-year career that included seven seasons in the Italian Serie A and a season in the English Premier League. In March 2004, Pelé named Nakata in his FIFA 100, a list of the top living footballers at the time. Nakata was the only Japanese, and one of only two Asian footballers to be named on the list. In 2018, Nakata was added as an icon to the Ultimate Team on the FIFA video game FIFA 18.

Club career

Early career
Nakata began his professional career at age 18 in 1995, with J1 League side Bellmare Hiratsuka (now Shonan Bellmare). He played many matches as offensive midfielder from first season and the club won the champions in 1995 Asian Cup Winners' Cup first Asian title in club history. At the final against Al-Talaba, he scored a winning goal in the 81st minute. From 1996, he became a regular player and he was selected J.League Best XI in 1997. After the 1998 World Cup in France, Nakata was signed by Perugia in Italy's Serie A for 4 million U.S. dollars, becoming the second Japanese player ever to appear in the Italian top league after Kazuyoshi Miura had done it for Genoa four years earlier. In his first season in Italy, Nakata scored 10 goals, his single-season highest total.

Roma
In January 2000, after one and a half seasons at Perugia, Nakata moved to Roma for 42 billion lire, helping the team win the scudetto. The highlight of Nakata's career at Roma came on 6 May 2001 in the Serie A match against Juventus at Stadio Delle Alpi. After replacing Francesco Totti in the second half with Roma trailing 0–2, Nakata netted with a 30-yard goal beyond Juventus goalkeeper Edwin van der Sar's reach, with 11 minutes left in the match. He then helped Roma score the equalizer when his fierce drive from outside the box was parried by Van der Sar into the path of Vincenzo Montella, who scored for Roma in the last minute. The match ended with a 2–2 draw and Roma maintained a six-point margin at top of the league table.

Parma
In the summer of 2001, Nakata penned a four-year deal with Parma for a transfer fee of 55 billion lire, a world record payment for an Asian player which would not be broken for 14 years. He made his club debut on 8 August 2001 in their 0–2 defeat at Stadio Ennio Tardini against Lille in the first leg of the third round of the Champions League. More than one month later, on 23 September, Nakata scored his first goal for Parma in Serie A at home over Brescia, which also proved to be the winning goal of the match. Nakata played there for two and a half seasons, where he scored a crucial goal after coming on as a substitute in the first leg of the 2002 Coppa Italia Final against Juventus, which Parma eventually won.

Later years
In January 2004, Nakata played for Bologna where he played the remainder of the 2003–04 season before moving to Fiorentina, where he played the following season. In August 2005, Nakata moved to Premiership side Bolton Wanderers on loan. During his season at Bolton, which would be the last of his professional career, he scored once in the league, in a 2-0 win over West Bromwich Albion.

International career

After having represented U-17 Japan at the 1993 U-17 World Championship (where he scored a goal) and U-20 Japan at the 1995 U-20 World Championship (where he scored twice), Nakata was part of the U-23 Japan squads at the 1996 Olympics, where Japan upset Brazil, and at the 2000 Olympics. His senior national team debut came in May 1997 against South Korea.

He was a key member of the Japanese side that qualified for the 1998 World Cup, scoring five goals in qualification matches and setting up all three Japanese goals in the qualification play-off against Iran. He helped Japan reach the final of the 2001 Confederations Cup but left the national team before the final to join Roma for their final league matches. Nakata played in all four of Japan's matches at the 2002 World Cup, co-hosted by South Korea and Japan, scoring the second goal of a 2–0 first round win against Tunisia.

At the 2006 World Cup, Nakata played in all three matches for Japan, losing to Australia and Brazil, and drawing with Croatia. His performance against Croatia earned him a Man of the Match award. After the 2006 FIFA World Cup, on 3 July 2006, Nakata announced his retirement from professional football and the Japanese national team on his personal website "I decided half a year ago that I would retire from the world of professional football ... after the World Cup in Germany." Nakata wrote, "I will never again stand on the pitch as a professional player. But I will never give up football." In a 2014 interview in TMW Magazine, Nakata confirmed that he had retired at such a young age because he was no longer enjoying football, and wanted instead to see what was going on in the world.

Despite Nakata playing every match in Japan's first three World Cup appearances, he was not selected for the country's Asian Cup-winning squads in 2000 and 2004. In total, he was capped 77 times for Japan, scoring 11 goals, 9 of which came in official FIFA competitions.

Style of play
A quick, creative, hard-working, and offensive-minded central midfielder, with an eye for goal, Nakata was known for his technical ability, agility, vision, passing, and his ability to make attacking runs into the penalty area and score goals; he also possessed a powerful shot from outside the box.

Outside football
Outside football, Nakata has shown interest in fashion, attending runway shows, wearing designer clothing and sporting colorful haircuts. He dyed his hair blond for the 1998 World Cup, hoping to attract the attention of European scouts. Japanese hairstylist Aki Watanabe credits him as a trendsetter. Andrea Tenerani, photographer for GQ in Italy said of Nakata, "He's perfect; he's like a model. And he's totally obsessed with fashion." Calvin Klein designer Italo Zucchelli said, "(Nakata) plays with fashion like all of them now, but in a cooler, more sophisticated way than many others." He is one of the models featuring the Calvin Klein underwear campaign 2010. He was featured in the July 2007 US version of GQ with a 12-page spread on fall fashion. He was featured in GQ in his home country in December 2011.

Often regarded as a Japanese David Beckham, Nakata is an editor-at-large at Monocle magazine at the invitation of his friend Tyler Brûlé, who serves as the magazine's editor-in-chief. Nakata has cited the popular manga and anime series, Captain Tsubasa, as his primary inspiration in choosing football as a career. In recent years, he has also been an active supporter of Special Olympics football and participated in the 2010 Special Olympics Unity Cup in South Africa during the World Cup. Nakata was named a Global Ambassador for Special Olympics in 2014.

Towards the end of 2015, Nakata entered into a partnership with Kee Club in Hong Kong to open Koko, a Hong Kong-based restaurant that serves sakes created by Nakata himself. He has developed his own line of sake as well as creating his own mobile educational app, "Sakenomy". Expressing interest in educating the public about sake, Nakata stated, "People recognise brands of wine but not usually brands of sake. There is a lack of information and branding when it comes to sake. That’s why I thought I needed to create a brand that people can recognise and understand. My purpose is to expand the market for all sake not just my own. You can pair any type of cuisine with sake. It can go with French, Italian, even Chinese food, not just Japanese cuisine."

Media
Having been signed to sportswear company Nike, Nakata featured in Nike's "Secret Tournament" advertisement (branded "Scorpion KO") directed by Terry Gilliam, in the buildup to the 2002 World Cup in Korea and Japan. He appeared alongside other star football players from around the world, including Ronaldo, Ronaldinho, Luís Figo, Thierry Henry, Roberto Carlos and Francesco Totti, with former player Eric Cantona the tournament "referee". Nakata featured on the front cover of various Japanese editions of EA Sports’ FIFA video game series, including FIFA Football 2002. In 2018, Nakata was added as an icon to the Ultimate Team in FIFA 19.
In the 2012 video game Inazuma Eleven 2: Firestorm / Blizzard Nakata was added as a hidden playable player. He then served an important story role in Inazuma Eleven 3 and its respective anime series, where Nakata would serve as the captain of the Italian team Orpheus.

Career statistics

Club

International

Scores and results list Japan's goal tally first, score column indicates score after each Nakata goal.

Honours
Bellmare Hiratsuka
 Asian Cup Winners Cup: 1996

Roma
 Serie A: 2000–01

Parma
 Coppa Italia: 2001–02

Japan
 Kirin Cup: 1997
 Dynasty Cup: 1998

Individual
 J. League All-Star Soccer: 1997
 J. League Best XI: 1997
 Japanese Footballer of the Year: 1997
 Japan Professional Sports Grand Prize: 1997
 Asian Footballer of the Year: 1997, 1998
Asian Player of the Month: May 1997, March 1998
 Dynasty Cup MVP: 1998
 AFC All Star Team: 1997, 1998, 1999
 FIFA Confederations Cup Bronze Ball: 2001
 FIFA Confederations Cup Best XI: 2001
 FIFA World Cup All-Star Team: 2002 (Reserve)
 J.League 20th Anniversary Team
 FIFA 100
 Golden Foot Legends Award: 2014
 IFFHS Legends
AFC Opta All-time World Cup XI: 2020

Achievements
 Nominated for Ballon d'Or: 1998, 1999, 2001
 Nominated for FIFA World Player of the Year: 1998, 1999, 2001, 2002

Notes and references

External links

 
 
 
 
 Hidetoshi Nakata at the Japan National Football Team Database
 
 
 Career profile and stats at FootballDatabase.com
 Player profile at official 2006 FIFA World Cup site
 Hidetoshi Nakata Revealed, on CNN.com

1977 births
Living people
1998 FIFA World Cup players
2001 FIFA Confederations Cup players
2002 FIFA World Cup players
2003 FIFA Confederations Cup players
2005 FIFA Confederations Cup players
2006 FIFA World Cup players
A.S. Roma players
Association football people from Yamanashi Prefecture
Bologna F.C. 1909 players
Bolton Wanderers F.C. players
Expatriate footballers in England
Expatriate footballers in Italy
FIFA 100
Japanese Footballer of the Year winners
ACF Fiorentina players
Association football midfielders
Footballers at the 1996 Summer Olympics
Footballers at the 2000 Summer Olympics
J1 League players
Japan youth international footballers
Japan international footballers
Japanese expatriate footballers
Japanese expatriate sportspeople in Italy
Japanese expatriate sportspeople in England
Japanese footballers
Olympic footballers of Japan
Parma Calcio 1913 players
A.C. Perugia Calcio players
Premier League players
Serie A players
Shonan Bellmare players
Asian Footballer of the Year winners
People from Kōfu, Yamanashi
Recipients of Italian civil awards and decorations